Phillipsia subpurpurea is a species of fungus in the family Sarcoscyphaceae. It is found in Australia where it grows as a saprophyte on wood. The fungus was first described scientifically by English mycologists Miles Joseph Berkeley and Christopher Edmund Broome. Its cup-shaped fruit bodies lack stipes and have purplish interior surfaces.

References

External links

Fungi described in 1883
Fungi of Australia
Sarcoscyphaceae
Taxa named by Miles Joseph Berkeley
Taxa named by Christopher Edmund Broome